The Bolivian Olympic Committee (Comité Olímpico Boliviano - COB) is the National Olympic Committee representing Bolivia in the International Olympic Committee (IOC), the Pan American Sports Organization (PASO), the Association of National Olympic Committees (ANOC) and the South American Sports Organization (ODESUR). It was created 1932 and recognized by the IOC in 1936.

It is based in La Paz, Bolivia.

Member federations
The Bolivian National Federations are the organizations that coordinate all aspects of their individual sports. They are responsible for training, competition and development of their sports. There are currently 19 Olympic Summer and one Winter Sport Federations in Bolivia.

Social media
The COB is present on social media, with the Press Office of the Committee running an official Facebook page and Twitter account.

See also
 Bolivia at the Olympics
 Bolivia at the Pan American Games

References

External links
 Official website

Bolivia
Bolivia at the Olympics
Olympics
1932 establishments in Bolivia
Sports organizations established in 1932